Shani Peters (born 1981) is an artist from Lansing, Michigan based in New York. She received her BA from Michigan State University and her MFA from the City College of New York, where she taught as of 2020. Her work often addresses issues related to social justice in a range of media and processes including printmaking, interpretations of record-keeping, collaborative projects, video, and collage. In 2019, she was a Joan Mitchell Foundation artist-in-residence in New Orleans. In 2017, she exhibited at Columbia University's Wallach Gallery.

Works 
 2011: "We Promote Love and Knowledge" (performance)
 2008: "White Lies, Black Noise" (exhibit) 
 2010: "Battle for the Hearts and Minds" (film)
 2016: "Peace and Restoration" (photo-montage)
 "The Crown" (traveling exhibit)
 "The Laundromat Project" (video)

References

External links 
 

Living people
Artists from Lansing, Michigan
Michigan State University alumni
City College of New York alumni
1981 births
Artists from New York City
21st-century American women artists
21st-century African-American women
21st-century African-American artists